John Mackey (born October 1, 1973) is an American composer of contemporary classical music, with an emphasis on music for wind band, as well as orchestra. For several years, he focused on music for modern dance and ballet.

Biography 
John Mackey was born in New Philadelphia, Ohio and grew up in Westerville, Ohio, where he attended Westerville South High School. Though musicians themselves, Mackey's parents did not provide him with music lessons, and he never formally studied an instrument. His grandfather, however, taught him to read music and introduced him to digital music notation. Through experimentation with programs intended for entertainment rather than education, Mackey began to compose his own music. He wrote his first piece, Lacrimosa, at age 11, after being inspired by the film Amadeus. As a young composer, he took some lessons from one of his mother's friends, who had a Ph.D. in music.

Mackey received a Bachelor of Fine Arts degree in 1995 from the Cleveland Institute of Music, where he studied with Donald Erb. He then studied with John Corigliano at Juilliard, receiving a Master of Music degree in 1997. Mackey has stated his support for these institutions' policies of not requiring composers to perform an instrumental audition, as many composers, like himself, do not play an instrument. On this subject, Mackey has said, "There are obviously ways to compose music without playing a formal instrument." 

Mackey lived in New York City from 1995–2005, where he collaborated frequently with choreographers such as David Parsons, Robert Battle, and Igal Perry. Mackey moved to Los Angeles in 2005. In April 2008, he announced on his blog his intention to move to Austin, Texas, explaining that much of his income is a result of commissions and other appearances in the Texas area. Then in March 2011, Mackey posted a blog to announce his move to Cambridge, Massachusetts in order for his wife to attend graduate school. In 2019, he moved with his wife to San Francisco, California, where he currently resides.

Concert band 
Mackey's first professional work was writing for dance companies. However, after attending the College Band Directors National Association conference in Minneapolis, he received a commission to reorchestrate his 2003 orchestral work "Redline Tango" for concert band. After reluctantly accepting, he completed the concert band version in 2005, and it became a great success. Today, Mackey is world-renowned as a concert band composer, and most of his works from the past decade have been for concert band. He regularly receives commissions from high school bands, college bands, and professional wind ensembles in the United States and Asia.

List of works

Orchestra 
 Do Not Go Gentle Into That Good Night (1993)
 Concerto for Percussion and Orchestra (2000)
 Redline Tango (2003)
 Antiphonal Dances (2003)
 Under the Rug (2004)
 Harvest: Concerto for Trombone and Orchestra without Strings (2009)
 Aurora Awakes (2019)
 Songs from the End of the World (2019)

Wind ensemble/concert band 
 Redline Tango (2005); won the ABA Ostwald Award
 Sasparilla (2005)
 Turbine (2006)
 Strange Humors (2006)
 Turning (2006)
 Kingfishers Catch Fire (2007)
 Concerto for Soprano Saxophone and Wind Ensemble (2007); a piano reduction is available as of 2013.
 Clocking (2007)
 Undertow (2008)
 Asphalt Cocktail (2009)
 Aurora Awakes (2009); won the ABA Ostwald Award and the NBA William D. Revelli Memorial Composition Contest
 Harvest: Concerto for Trombone and Orchestra without Strings (2009)
 Xerxes (2010)
 Hymn to a Blue Hour (2010)
 Foundry (2011)
 Drum Music: Concerto for Percussion and Wind Ensemble (2011)
 Sheltering Sky (2012)
 High Wire (2012)
 The Frozen Cathedral (2013)
 The Soul Has Many Motions (2013)
 Night on Fire (2013), movement II of "The Soul Has Many Motions" (available separately)
 Unquiet Spirits (2013), movement III of "The Soul Has Many Motions" (available separately)
 (Redacted) (2013)
 Wine-Dark Sea: Symphony for Band (2014)
 The Ringmaster’s March (2014)
 Lightning Field (2015)
 Fanfare for Full Fathom Five (2015), for brass and percussion ensemble (and optional organ)
 Liminal (2016)
 This Cruel Moon (2017)
 Antique Violences: Concerto for Trumpet and Wind Ensemble (2017)
 The Night Garden (2017)
 Snarl (2018)
 The Rumor of a Secret King (2018)
 Until the Scars (2019)
 Places we can no longer go (2019), for vocal soprano and wind ensemble; text by A. E. Jaques
 Sacred Spaces (2019)
Some treasures are heavy with human tears (2021)
Let Me Be Frank With You (2022)
A deep reverberation fills with stars (2022)
Divine Mischief: Concerto for Clarinet and Wind Ensemble (2022)

Adaptable Ensemble 
 This Cruel Moon – adaptable (2020), minimum 5-parts (SAATB)
 Strange Humors – adaptable (2020), minimum 4-parts (SATB) plus djembe
 Let Me Be Frank With You (2020), minimum 4-parts (SATB) plus drum set
 Sheltering Sky – adaptable (2020), minimum 4-parts (SATB)
 Night on Fire – adaptable (2021), minimum 4-parts (SATB) plus one percussionist

Choir 
 Alleluia (1992), for 5-part choir (S1, S2, A, T, B)
The Rumor of a Secret King (2017), for SATB choir; text by A. E. Jaques
Cradle Song (2021), for SATB choir; text by A. E. Jaques

Chamber ensemble 
 Elegy and Fantasie (1989, 1991), for violin and piano
 Tango (1991), for viola and two pianos
 Mom Song (1991), for flute, guitar, cello, and harpsichord
 Piano Trio in Two Movements (1992), for violin, cello, and piano
 The Other Side (1994), for double bass or cello and piano
 Mood Indigo (1996), for piano and drum set
 Strange Humors (1998), for string quartet and djembe
 Damn (1998), for amplified clarinet and four percussionists
 Voices and Echoes (1999), for string quartet
 Rush Hour (1999, revised 2000), for clarinet, electric string quartet, and drum set
 Breakdown Tango (2000), for clarinet, violin, cello, and piano
 Juba (2003), for electric string quartet and percussion
 Wrong-Mountain Stomp (2004), for violin, viola, and cello
 Mass (2004), for percussion ensemble
 Strange Humors (2008), for saxophone quartet and djembe
 Sultana (2009), for saxophone and piano
 Strange Humors (2012), for clarinet quartet and djembe
 Unquiet Spirits (2012), for saxophone quartet
 Hymn to a Blue Hour (2012), for trombone ensemble
 Songs from the End of the World (2015), for vocal soprano and mixed chamber ensemble; text by A. E. Jaques; a piano reduction is available as of 2017.
 Hymn to a Blue Hour (2021), for minimum 16-part ensemble

Musical theater 
 Score and songs for Shakespeare's Twelfth Night, Dallas Theater Center (2001)

Notes

References

Bibliography 
 Meet the Composer: John Mackey with UK Bands Meet the Composer: John Mackey with UK Bands UKNow (University of Kentucky)
 John Mackey: The Composer, His Compositional Style and a Conductor's Analysis of Redline Tango and Turbine Rebecca L Philips' doctoral dissertation
 JW Pepper long-form interview with John Mackey

External links 
 

1973 births
Living people
20th-century classical composers
21st-century classical composers
American male classical composers
American classical composers
Cleveland Institute of Music alumni
Concert band composers
People from Westerville, Ohio
Juilliard School alumni
21st-century American composers
People from New Philadelphia, Ohio
20th-century American composers
Classical musicians from Ohio
20th-century American male musicians
21st-century American male musicians